Sole Street railway station is on the Chatham Main Line in England, serving the village of Sole Street, near Cobham, Kent. The station is managed by Southeastern.

Office of Rail Regulation statistics suggest that the decline in traffic at Sole Street that has been noted since 2009/10 coincided with the opening of fast High Speed One services from nearby Strood.

History
The main line of the London, Chatham and Dover Railway was opened in stages.

Facilities and Connections
The station has a ticket office which is open during the morning peak only (06:00-10:00 Mon-Fri). At other times, the station is unstaffed and tickets can be purchased from the self-service ticket machine at the station. The station is fitted with modern help points and covered seating is available on both platforms. The station also has toilets which are located in the stations ticket office. There is also a small chargeable car park located outside the main entrance to the station. The station has step free access to the London bound platform however access to the Kent bound platform is via the stepped footbridge only so is not accessible.

The station is served infrequently Monday-Saturday by the route 416 bus operated by Redroute Buses which provides connections to Gravesend and Meopham.

Services
All services at Sole Street are operated by Southeastern using ,  and  EMUs.

The typical off-peak service in trains per hour is:
 1 tph to  via 
 1 tph to 

During the peak hours, the service is increased to 2 tph.

References

External links

Gravesham
Railway stations in Kent
Former London, Chatham and Dover Railway stations
Railway stations in Great Britain opened in 1861
Railway stations served by Southeastern
1861 establishments in England